Tancredi Fassini-Camossi (27 December 1900 – 4 September 1943) was an Italian professional ice hockey defense who played for the Italian national team.

Personal life
Fassini served as an engineer and pilot in the Regia Aeronautica during the Second World War. On 4 September 1943, after hearing about the death of his mother at Pisa in an Allied bombing raid 5 days earlier, Fassini took off in a stolen aircraft to fly to Pisa. During the flight, he crashed and was killed.

Career statistics

International career

References

1900 births
1943 deaths
Sportspeople from Turin
Italian ice hockey defencemen
20th-century Italian engineers
Regia Aeronautica personnel of World War II
Italian World War II pilots
Italian military personnel killed in World War II
Aviators killed in aviation accidents or incidents in Italy
Victims of aviation accidents or incidents in 1943